Ahti Karjalainen's second cabinet was the 53rd government of Finland. The cabinet existed from 15 July 1970 to 29 October 1971. It was a majority coalition government formed by the Social Democratic Party of Finland, the Agrarian League, the Finnish People's Democratic League, the Liberals, and the Swedish People's Party of Finland.

Ministers

References

Karjalainen
1970 establishments in Finland
1971 disestablishments in Finland
Cabinets established in 1970
Cabinets disestablished in 1971